Carry the Fire may refer to:

 Carry the Fire (Delta Rae album), 2012
 Carry the Fire (Dustin Kensrue album), 2015
 Carry the Fire (WorshipMob album), 2015